Haut Valromey (literally Upper Valromey) is a commune in the Ain department of eastern France. The municipality was established on January 1, 2016 and consists of the former communes of Hotonnes, Le Grand-Abergement, Le Petit-Abergement and Songieu.

See also 
Communes of the Ain department

References 

Communes of Ain
Communes nouvelles of Ain
Populated places established in 2016
2016 establishments in France